Cuban Assassin may refer to one of the following professional wrestlers:
 David Sierra (born 1960), professional wrestler, a longtime veteran of the Puerto Rico-based World Wrestling Council
 Ángel Acevedo (born 1945), professional wrestler appearing with Atlantic Grand Prix Wrestling, Central States Wrestling and Stampede Wrestling